Winebrenner Theological Seminary (WTS) is a private evangelical Christian seminary located in Findlay, Ohio and associated with the Churches of God General Conference (CGGC). It was established in 1942 as a graduate school of theology of Findlay College (renamed The University of Findlay in 1989) and received its charter from the state of Ohio to become an independent, degree-granting institution in 1961. The seminary derives its name from the founder of the denomination, John Winebrenner, who established the group in 1825 in Harrisburg, Pennsylvania.

WTS continues to serve the CGGC as its sole seminary as well as students from 35 different denominational backgrounds. WTS is accredited by the Association of Theological Schools in the United States and Canada (ATS) and the Higher Learning Commission. Winebrenner offers three masters programs: a Master of Divinity (M.Div.), a Master of Arts (MA) in Practical Theology, and a Master of Arts in Clinical Counseling program. Winebrenner Seminary also offers a Doctor of Ministry (D.Min.) program and an Institution of Christian Studies.

Accreditation 
Winebrenner Theological Seminary is accredited by the Commission on Accrediting of The Association of Theological Schools in the United States and Canada, and by the Higher Learning Commission. Winebrenner is chartered by the State of Ohio and has received a Certificate of Authorization from the Ohio Department of Higher Education.

References

External links
Official site

Seminaries and theological colleges in Ohio
Findlay, Ohio